The Silverthrone Glacier is a glacier at the northwest head of Knight Inlet in southwestern British Columbia, Canada (51°26'00''N, 125°53'00''W).

References

Glaciers of the Pacific Ranges
Central Coast of British Columbia